Punnett's Town is a village in the Wealden district of East Sussex. The main street is Battle road, which is part of the B2096 road. 
 Blackdown Mill is a grade II listed smock mill which has been restored.

References

External links
 Punnetts Town Village Website
 Punnets Town Community Primary School
 Punnetts Town in East Sussex (The Windmill on the Hill) - listing on villagenet.co.uk

Villages in East Sussex
Warbleton